The 1936 UK & Ireland Greyhound Racing Year was the 11th year of greyhound racing in the United Kingdom and Ireland.

Summary
The nations leading Greyhound company, the Greyhound Racing Association (GRA) continued to grow and recorded record profits. The operating profit for 1936 was £215,583 (a substantial figure at the time) and attendances at GRA tracks increased from 3,817,934 to 3,849,513 despite the fact that the company held 160 fewer meetings. The GRA then opened Harringay Arena on 10 October, which would become famous for ice hockey and boxing.

At least ten more tracks opened as racing retained its status as a national pastime. Fine Jubilee trained by Marjorie Yate was the star of the year, after winning the 1936 English Greyhound Derby and the Gold Collar.

Roll of honour

Tracks
The Dolphin Stadium in Slough, was bought by New Clapton Stadium Co. Ltd and they renamed it the Slough Stadium. Rochester and Chatham Sports Stadium opened and was listed as the 55th National Greyhound Racing Club (NGRC) licensed track during 1936. The majority of tracks were independent and nicknamed flapping tracks (unlicensed). 

A planned stadium in Barnsley on the Queens Road, with an NGRC application pending which had held whippet racing since 1928 was refused a betting licence.

Tracks opened

Competitions
Shove Halfpenny won the West Ham Spring Cup, the Wood Lane Stakes at White City and the Daily Mirror Championship. The fawn dog then finished second in the St Leger final, which was won by his kennelmate Ataxy in a national record time of 40.39 for 700 yards. Shove Halfpenny was out of luck again at West Ham Stadium during the Cesarewitch despite winning every round and breaking the track record to get to the final. The final however resulted in the same result when Ataxy won his second classic of the year, Shove Halfpenny failed to record a time after encountering significant trouble in the race.

Towards the end of the year White City staged a one off invitation race simply called "The White City" which was worth £600. The race was won by Pall Mall Stakes champion Safe Rock who beat the Wembley Spring Cup and Wimbledon Spring Cup winner Shandy Gaff into second place. The Derby champion Fine Jubilee finished a disappointing fifth.

Ireland
The first greyhound track in Cork known as The Show Grounds Greyhound Track closed on 20 September 1935, following the decision to relocate to a site nearer the city centre. The site chosen was between Western Road and the north bank of the River Lee near the Wellington Bridge and would be known as Cork Greyhound Stadium. Minstrel Rover won the 1936 Irish Greyhound Derby.

News
Multiple companies emerged, JR Smiths introduced a hurdle with a patent and it was endorsed by the NGRC, it allowed a cushioning effect when greyhounds hit them as they jumped over them. They also made what was called a crush barrier, fencing that surrounded the track and would also cushion a greyhound's impact should they run into it. Mortimers were selling all greyhound necessities and M.S Cable Hare Co Ltd from Belfast made the majority of the hare equipment supplies. Benbow's sold greyhound food and mixtures and medicines and Radiol sold greyhound body wash.

Principal UK races

Key
U = unplaced
TR = Track Record

References 

Greyhound racing in the United Kingdom
Greyhound racing in the Republic of Ireland
1936 in British sport
1936 in Irish sport
1936 in Welsh sport
1936 in Scottish sport